"Sexual" (also known as "Sensual" in censored versions) is a song by Swedish collective Neiked featuring vocals from English singer Dyo. It was released for digital download on 26 August 2016 through Neiked Collective, Casablanca Records, Polydor Records and Republic Records.

Composition
"Sexual" is a high-energy pop track and has been described as having elements of funk.

Critical reception
Mike Wass of Idolator described the song as a "future hit" and claimed that Dyo's vocals sounded like "Kiiara [if she] took a handful of happy pills".

Commercial performance
The song was a commercial success in the United Kingdom and Australia. On the UK Singles Chart dated 8 September 2016, the song debuted at number 83. Eight weeks later, on the chart dated 3 November 2016, the song rose to number 6, becoming Neiked's first top ten hit, and Dyo's fifth. On its fifteen-week on the chart, dated 15 December 2016, the song moved to number five, becoming Dyo's fourth top five hit. On the Australian Singles Chart dated 6 November 2016, "Sexual" debuted at number 33. On the chart dated 21 November 2016, it rose to number four, where it peaked.

Interpolations and remixes

Maroon 5 
Maroon 5's 2017 single "What Lovers Do" contains interpolations of "Sexual", therefore Victor Rådström, Elina Stridh and Dyo are credited as songwriters.

Oliver Nelson Remix 
In response to the Oliver Nelson remix of the song, Perez Hilton described the song as "killer" and that he predicted it was "soon to be burning up dancefloors worldwide".

Charts

Weekly charts

Year-end charts

Certifications

Release history

References

2016 singles
2016 songs
Dyo (singer) songs
Casablanca Records singles
Neiked songs
Polydor Records singles
Republic Records singles
Song recordings produced by Neiked
Universal Music Group singles